Tzitzio is a municipality in the Mexican state of Michoacán, located approximately  southeast of the state capital of Morelia.

Geography
It borders the municipalities of Charo and Indaparapeo to the north, Queréndaro to the northeast, Hidalgo to the east, Tuzantla to the southeast, Tiquicheo to the south, Madero to the west, and Morelia to the northwest.

As of 2009, the land cover in Tzitzio consists of temperate forest (63%), tropical forest (33%) and grassland (1%). Another 2% of the land is used for agriculture and less than 0.1% is urbanized. Some of the western parts of the municipality drain into the Carácuaro River. The southeastern corner of  extends into Tzitzio near its municipal seat.

Tzitzio's climate varies from temperate in the north to tropical in the south, with rain falling in the summer.

History
Tzitzio is a word of Chichimeca origin meaning "beautiful place". In 1831 it was a tenencia in the municipality of Indaparapeo. Its inhabitants produced sugarcane, guava, sapote, and other tropical fruits, and wove chiquihuites or baskets. It was made an independent municipality in 1936.

Administration
The municipal government comprises a president, a councillor (Spanish: síndico), and seven trustees (regidores), four elected by relative majority and three by proportional representation. The current president of the municipality is Emilia Herrera Sánchez.

Demographics
In the 2010 Mexican Census, the municipality of Tzitzio recorded a population of 9166 inhabitants living in 2046 households. The 2015 Intercensal Survey estimated a population of 8966 inhabitants in Tzitzio.

INEGI lists 271 localities in the municipality, of which only the municipal seat, also known as Tzitzio, is classified as urban. It recorded a population of 1072 inhabitants in the 2010 Census. The most populated locality in the municipality is the village of Tafetán, which recorded a population of 1784 inhabitants in the 2010 Census.

Economy
Tzitzio's economy is based on agriculture. Major activities include cattle farming and the cultivation of corn, tomatoes, sugarcane, and fruits such as mango, guava, plum and papaya.

References

Municipalities of Michoacán
1936 establishments in Mexico
States and territories established in 1936